The Ombudsman's Office of Colombia is the national government agency that is charged with overseeing the protection of civil and human rights within the legal framework of the Republic of Colombia. The ombudsman, or People's Defender, is an official appointed by the President, and elected by the Chamber of Representatives of Colombia, to head this agency.

The Ombudsman’s Office is funded through the Inspector General’s Office, but it operates independently in administration and budget. In addition to its complaint-handling role, the Ombudsman is the national human rights institution, accredited with A status by the ICC.

References

Colombia, ombudsman
National human rights institutions
Government agencies established in 1992
Government agencies of Colombia
Human rights in Colombia